Mounir Chouiar (born 23 January 1999) is a French professional footballer who plays for Turkish club Kasımpaşa on loan from İstanbul Başakşehir. Mainly a left winger, he is known for his crossing ability.

Club career
Chouiar made his debut at professional level for Lens in a 0–0 Ligue 2 tie with Niort on 29 July 2016.

On 8 July 2022, Chouiar transferred to İstanbul Başakşehir in Turkey. On 28 January 2023, he was loaned to Kasımpaşa.

Personal life
Born in France, Chouiar has Moroccan and Mauritanian ancestry.

References

External links
 
 
 France profile at FFF
 

1999 births
Living people
Association football forwards
French footballers
France youth international footballers
French sportspeople of Mauritanian descent
French sportspeople of Moroccan descent
RC Lens players
Dijon FCO players
Yeni Malatyaspor footballers
İstanbul Başakşehir F.K. players
Kasımpaşa S.K. footballers
Ligue 1 players
Ligue 2 players
Süper Lig players
French expatriate footballers
French expatriate sportspeople in Turkey
Expatriate footballers in Turkey